The Brunts Academy, a large secondary school in Mansfield, Nottinghamshire, England, is a member of the Greenwood Academies Trust. The school specialises in the performing arts. It has previously been a grammar school and a secondary technical school and traces its foundation to a bequest by Samuel Brunt in 1709.

The Brunts School became The Brunts Academy with effect from 1 January 2012.

The Brunts Academy became a part of the Greenwood Academies Trust and left the Evolve Trust, effective 1 December 2022

History
The Brunts Academy can trace its history back to an elementary school that was founded in 1687 and had endowments equal to £100 per year. In 1709, Samuel Brunt left a bequest in order that local children could learn an honest trade. The bequest and the school resulted in 40 boys and girls learning reading, writing and arithmetic by 1831 with the girls particularly studying needlework. It was not until 60 years later that the school and the bequest were combined. In recognition of his significance in the school's founding, Brunt was referenced in the school's former 'school song', composed in 1944 by former music teachers H S Rosen and A D Sanders.

In 1830 Brunts Charity owned buildings and land in East Bridgford, Nottingham's marketplace and at Claypole in Lincolnshire. It was the richest of all the charitable foundations in Mansfield in 1832 when it was paying out £4 a year to 220 different claimants.

By 1891, Samuel Brunt's bequest was worth £3,800 so the new school was named Brunts Technical School. A new building was established at Woodhouse Road, Mansfield with the new Brunts Technical School officially opened 29 September 1894. In 1976 Brunts Grammar School became a comprehensive. The old school buildings were closed prior to 1999, with pupils transferred to a new build on a greenfield site nearby at The Park.

The Samuel Brunts Statue. This statue used to be on the front of the old Black Boy hotel in Nottingham Market Place. When the hotel was pulled down a Mansfield coal merchant rescued the statue and gave it back to the school. If you look closely above the door to ‘Brunts Chambers’ at the corner of Clumber Street and Leeming Street you can see another of these statues. This statue now sits in the memorial garden.

The School Song. The former grammar school was distinguished by the fact that it had its own school song, composed by a former music teacher.

Old Samuel Brunts was a yeoman staunch In the days of good Queen Ann. He’d a heart as big as his periwig And he loved his fellow man. As he strolled one day down Toothill Lane With his red-heeled shoes and his gold-topped cane, He took a pinch of choice rappee “And I know what I’ll do with my lands,” said he.

Organisation
The school's intake is taken from a number of schools known as the 'family of schools'. The list includes King Edward School, Sutton Road School, St Peter's (C of E) School, High Oakham School and Newgate Primary School.

The school uniform includes distinctive green blazers for both boys and girls. The school colours are green, gold, white, purple, grey and black and the school emblem is a rearing griffin within a shield with the academy's motto, meaning "nothing is impossible for humankind" emblazoned upon it.

Academic standards
In 2002, there were nearly 1,500 pupils in the school, of whom fewer than 1,300 were at age 16 or below. The school achieved 57% A-C passes with only 5% achieving no passes at all. This was 5% better than the county and 10% above the national average.

Overall the school is characterised by a high proportion of white pupils compared with the national average and nearly all students have English as their first language. Attainment was "broadly average" at the visit of Her Majesty's Inspectorate in 2009 (before academy status); the school was assessed as "satisfactory" with higher marks for its pastoral care. A subsequent Ofsted two-day audit in 2013 returned "good" findings across all areas inspected.

The Sixth Form at The Brunts Academy has achieved a 100% pass rate for the third year in a row since 2020

Notable former pupils
Rebecca Adlington, OBE, double Olympic gold medal-winning swimmer.
Prof. George Bond, Prof of Biology (1906–1988)
Arthur Bown (1921–1994), conductor
Samuel Harrison Clarke CBE (1903–94), Fire research
Prof. Nicholas F. R. Crafts (1949–) Professor of Economics
Burley Higgins (1913–1940), pilot
Peter Mosley- Founder of Dingle Distillery 
Prof. Eric Jakeman FRS (1939– ) Prof. of Statistics
Nigel Francis Lightfoot, (1945– ), Microbiologist
Prof. Major James McCunn (1894–1967) Vet
Jim McGrath, TV commentator
Adrian Metcalfe (1942– ) UK athlete, silver medal winner Tokyo Olympics 1964
Prof. Norman Millott (1912–1990) Biologist
Graham Moore QPM (1947– ) Chief Constable
Dr Robert Henry Priestley (1946– ) Biologist and publisher
Sir Bernard (Evans) Tomlinson (1920–2017) pathologist
Dr Charles Wass (1911–89), mines safety expert
John Whetton – UK athlete, European 1,500-metre champion Athens 1969
Tom Scott, educator and YouTube personality.
Calvin Robinson, Anglican deacon, political commentator, journalist, policy advisor and campaigner

Awards
In 2003 Brunts was awarded the Artsmark Gold Award and in 2006 the Healthy Schools Gold Standard and the Full International School Award.

References

External links

Brunts Charity

Secondary schools in Nottinghamshire
Educational institutions established in 1709
1709 establishments in England
Academies in Nottinghamshire
Schools in Mansfield